Miss Midi-Pyrénées is a French beauty pageant which selects a representative for the Miss France national competition from the region of Midi-Pyrénées. Women representing the region under various different titles have competed at Miss France since 1968, although the Miss Midi-Pyrénées title was not used regularly until 2010.

The current Miss Midi-Pyrénées is Florence Demortier, who was crowned Miss Midi-Pyrénées 2022 on 3 September 2022. One woman from Midi-Pyrénées has been crowned Miss France:
Chloé Mortaud, who was crowned Miss France 2009, competing as Miss Albigeois Midi-Pyrénées

Results summary
Miss France: Chloé Mortaud (2008; Miss Albigeois Midi-Pyrénées)
1st Runner-Up: Marie Borg (1996; Miss Toulouse Midi-Pyrénées)
2nd Runner-Up: Marie-Thérèse Thiel (1970; Miss Gascony); Nadia Poullain (1983; Miss Rouergue); Laura Fasquel (2005; Miss Albigeois Midi-Toulousain)
3rd Runner-Up: Marie-France Parnot (1983; Miss Quercy); Carole Moretto (1993; Miss Albigeois)
4th Runner-Up: Violette Pena	(1968; Miss Toulouse-Languedoc); Céline Cassagnes (1990); Nathalie Ample (2009; Miss Quercy-Rouergue)
5th Runner-Up: Émeline Laganthe (1989); Carine Bedoya (2000); Christel Leyenberger (2002; Miss Quercy-Rouergue)
Top 12/Top 15: Brigitte Herrera (1987); Christelle Rocagel (1987; Miss Rouergue); Céline Duthil (1993; Miss Toulouse Midi-Pyrénées); Stéphanie Kaysen (1994; Miss Toulouse); Marie-Alexie Bazerque (2005); Lisa Fernandez (2005; Miss Quercy-Rouergue); Eurydice Rigal (2007; Miss Albigeois Midi-Toulousain); Laura Madelain (2011); Florence Demortier (2022)

Titleholders

Miss Albigeois
From 1993 to 2002, the department of Tarn competed separately under the title Miss Albigeois.

Miss Albigeois Midi-Pyrénées
In 2008 and 2009, the region crowned a representative under the title Miss Albigeois Midi-Pyrénées.

Miss Albigeois Midi-Toulousain
From 2003 to 2007, the region crowned a representative under the title Miss Albigeois Midi-Toulousain.

Miss Armagnac
In 1978, the department of Gers competed separately under the title Miss Armagnac.

Miss Bigorre-Béarn
In 2003 and 2004, the department of Hautes-Pyrénées competed separately under the title Miss Bigorre-Béare.

Miss Comminges
In 1964 and from 1993 to 2002, the department of Haute-Garonne competed separately under the title Miss Comminges.

Miss Comminges Pyrénées
From 2003 to 2007, the region crowned a representative under the title Miss Comminges Pyrénées.

Miss Gascony
From the 1970s to 2000s, Midi-Pyrénées and Aquitaine crowned a representative under the title Miss Gascony, to represent the historic region of Gascony, now located in Midi-Pyrénées and Aquitaine. Representatives crowned Miss Gascony who hailed from Aquitaine are included in the Miss Aquitaine article.

Miss Midi-Pyrénées-Toulouse
From 1997 to 1999, the region crowned a representative under the title Miss Midi-Pyrénées-Toulouse.

Miss Quercy
In the 1980s and 1990s, the departments of Lot and Tarn-et-Garonne competed separately under the title Miss Quercy.

Miss Quercy-Rouergue
From 2001 to 2009, the departments of Aveyron, Lot, and Tarn-et-Garonne competed separately under the title Miss Quercy-Rouergue.

Miss Rouergue
In 1977, 1979, 1983, from 1985 to 1993, and in 1995, the department of Aveyron competed separately under the title Miss Rouergue.

Miss Rouergue-Cévennes
In 1996, the department of Aveyron competed separately under the title Miss Rouergue-Cévennes.

Miss Toulouse
Sporadically in the 1970s, 1980s, and 1990s, the department of Haute-Garonne competed separately under the title Miss Toulouse.

Miss Toulouse Midi-Pyrénées
In 1988, 1993, 1995, and 1996, the region crowned a representative under the title Miss Toulouse Midi-Pyrénées.

Miss Toulouse-Languedoc
In 1968, the regions of Midi-Pyrénées and Languedoc-Roussillon crowned a shared representative under the title Miss Toulouse-Languedoc.

Notes

References

External links

Miss France regional pageants
Beauty pageants in France
Women in France